Kobylnica may refer to the following places:
Kobylnica, Greater Poland Voivodeship (west-central Poland)
Kobylnica, Masovian Voivodeship (east-central Poland)
Kobylnica, Pomeranian Voivodeship (north Poland)